Behnam Seraj (born June 19, 1971) is a retired Iranian football player and manager. He previously played for the Iran national football team. He was one of the most successful strikers in the Iran Pro League.

Honours
Persepolis
Iranian Football League (2):1998–99, 1999–00
Hazfi Cup (1): 1998–99

References

1971 births
Living people
Persepolis F.C. players
Sanat Naft Abadan F.C. players
Iranian footballers
Association football forwards
1998 FIFA World Cup players
Iran international footballers
Iranian football managers
Azadegan League players
Persian Gulf Pro League players
Sanat Naft Abadan F.C. managers